Robert F. Berkhofer (November 30, 1931 – June 25, 2012) was an American historian. He was a professor of history emeritus at the University of California, Santa Cruz and former president of the American Studies Association.

Early life and education
Berkhofer was born on November 30, 1931, in Teaneck, New Jersey, to Swiss-German parents. The family lived on a dairy farm in Greeneville, New York, where he then contracted polio at the age of 13 and was confined to a hospital for one year. On the day Japan surrendered in World War II, his mother released him from the hospital and spent three years giving him physical therapy at home so he could walk without a brace. He earned his Bachelor of Arts degree from the University at Albany, SUNY and his PhD from Cornell University. He completed his graduate degrees under the guidance of Paul Wallace Gates and earned a fellowship at Fort Ticonderoga.

Career
Upon receiving his PhD, Berkhofer spent one academic year at Ohio State University before accepting a position as an assistant professor at the University of Minnesota. During this time, he became engaged and married his wife Genevieve (nee Zito) in 1962. He stayed in Minnesota for nine years, where he rose through the academic ranks to associate professor and chair of American studies by 1969. During this time, he also published his first book through the University of Kentucky Press titled Salvation and the Savage: An Analysis of Protestant Missions and American Indian Response, 1787-1862.

Berkhofer left Minnesota in 1969 to accept a professorship position at the University of Wisconsin, during which he published A Behavioral Approach to Historical Analysis. In the book, Berkhofer explained that historians should adapt their discipline by learning from two different groups; social scientists and philosophers of science and history. He also played a role in establishing an undergraduate course focused on American Indian history including tribes and the white man's image of Indians. During the 1973–1974 academic year, Berkhofer received a National Endowment for the Humanities Senior Fellowship to study the "evolving concepts of the American Indian."

Following the publication of his second book, Berkhofer transferred to the University of Michigan (UMich) where he stayed for almost three decades. While there, he received a Guggenheim Fellowship to research United States history and was appointed  president of the American Studies Association. Berkhofer also continued his studies into American Indians and published The White Man's Indian: Images of the American Indian from Columbus to the Present in 1978. In this book, he explored the dichotomy between the Colonial concept of the noble savage and bloodthirsty heathens of which only one were considered "worthy of submission."

As he grew older and experienced post-polio pains, Berkhofer accepted a one year position at the University of Florida and finally the University of California, Santa Cruz (UCSC). He worked at UCSC from 1991 until 2007, when he chose to retire. Berkhofer died on June 25, 2012, in Davis, California.

Personal life
Prior to his wife's death in 2007, Berkhofer and Genevieve Zito Berkhofer had one son together.

References

2012 deaths
1931 births
20th-century American historians
University of Michigan faculty
University of Wisconsin–Madison faculty
Ohio State University faculty
University of California, Santa Cruz faculty
Cornell University alumni
American male non-fiction writers
University at Albany, SUNY alumni